Poonamben Maadam Yadav  (b 1974) is a politician from Gujarat state in India. She is the Member of parliament, Lok Sabha from Jamnagar. Earlier, she was a member of Gujarat Legislative Assembly from Khambhalia in dwarka district.

Family background 
Poonam Maadam is the daughter of Dinaben and Hematbhai Maadam. She holds a bachelor's degree in commerce from Gujarat University. She is married to a former defence officer Parminder Mahajan. (Ref: Members: Lok Sabha.)

Her father served as independent MLA for four consecutive terms during 1972–1990 in Jamkhambhaliya. Her grandfather Rambhai Maadam was active in Ahir/Yadav community work in the field of education.  Jam Khambhaliya's Congress MLA Vikram Maadam is her uncle.

Their daughter Shivani (born 22 Feb 1995), died in Singapore on 9 Dec 2018 due to burn injuries suffered in Noida.

Career 
She was a member of the Congress party at the beginning of her political career but later, joined BJP.

She was a member of the Gujarat Legislative Assembly from 2012 to 2014. She contested the 2014 Lok Sabha elections from Jamnagar's seat as the BJP candidate and won against her uncle Vikram Maadam of Congress. She got a total of 484,412 votes and won with a margin of 175,289 votes.  She got 5,91,588 votes in 2019 and was re-elected with a margin of 2, 36,804 for the 17th Lok Sabha.

Poonam Maadam has been a member of various parliamentary committees: (Members: Lok Sabha (loksabhaph.nic.in)
•	Committee on Empowerment of Women 
•	Standing Committee on Industry 
•	Consultative Committee, Ministry of Civil Aviation 
•	Committee on Public Undertakings 
•	Zonal Railway Users’ Consultative Committee
•	Institute body of AIIMS-Rajkot

Poonam Maadam is a member of IPU (Inter-Parliamentary Union) and has contributed to forming policies as a young woman parliamentarian. (Ref 206th session of Governing Council of Inter-Parliamentary Union concludes (aninews.in)

In media:

In May 2017, Maadam was injured during her visit to Jalaramnagar area of Jamnagar city to stop demolition drive.

A news flashed in April, 2015 during a 'Bhagwat Katha' programme organised in Gujarat's Veraval to raise funds for welfare initiates in the area. It was reported that Rs 3 crore was raised.

References

1974 births
Gujarat MLAs 2012–2017
India MPs 2014–2019
Women in Gujarat politics
People from Jamnagar
Living people
Lok Sabha members from Gujarat
21st-century Indian women politicians
21st-century Indian politicians
Bharatiya Janata Party politicians from Gujarat
India MPs 2019–present
Gujarat University alumni